"Hurricane" is a song by American singer and songwriter Halsey. First appearing on her extended play (EP), Room 93 (2014), the song was re-released on her debut studio album, Badlands (2015). The song was written by Halsey and Tim Anderson. It was released as a promotional single on October 11, 2014. The Arty remix was featured in the 2016 film Nerve starring Emma Roberts and Dave Franco.

Music video
The official music video for "Hurricane" premiered on October 16, 2014. It was filmed at the Pink Motel in Los Angeles, which was also the location of her first music video for the song "Ghost".  The video was singled out by Billboard Magazine for an exclusive debut.  It has since accumulated over 40 million views on YouTube.

Composition 
Halsey drew her inspiration for "Hurricane" from the literary-fiction novel, The Wanderess, by Roman Payne (2013).

The song is also dedicated to her friend Zach, an older guy she was seeing. Zach is also the inspiration behind a lot of Halsey's discography.

Certifications

References

2014 songs
2015 singles
Astralwerks singles
Capitol Records singles
Halsey (singer) songs
Songs written by Halsey (singer)
Songs written by Tim Anderson (musician)